Mohamed Souibaâh (born 25 December 1991 in Baraki) is an Algerian footballer who plays for ASO Chlef.

Club career
On 22 July, 2016, Souibaâh signed a contract with MC Oran, joining them on a transfer from Paradou AC.
In 2020, Souibaâh signed a contract with CR Belouizdad.

References

External links
 

1991 births
Living people
Algerian footballers
Algerian Ligue Professionnelle 1 players
Paradou AC players
MC Oran players
MC Alger players
Footballers from Algiers
IB Khémis El Khechna players
Association football forwards
21st-century Algerian people